Hibbert Newton Binney (1766–1842) was a soldier in the Royal Nova Scotia Volunteer Regiment in the American Revolution.  He became a member of the Nova Scotia Council.  He was also a painter who created some of the earliest images of the Mi'kmaq people.  He was the grandson of Henry Newton and the son of Jonathan Binney who was a signatory to one of the Halifax Treaties with the Mi'kmaq.   Hibbert is buried in the Old Burying Ground (Halifax, Nova Scotia).  There is a mural tablet at St. Paul's Church (Halifax) to his son commander Lieut. John Binney and 11 crew of the mail packet brig Star, that all died at sea.  His grandfathers were Henry Newton (politician) and Bishop Hibbert Binney.  He was also the son-in-law of John Creighton (judge).

Gallery

See also 
Nova Scotia in the American Revolution

References

Links 
  Binney's paintings

History of Nova Scotia